Lisiya is an almost abandoned village in Blagoevgrad Municipality, in Blagoevgrad Province, Bulgaria. It is situated in the foothills of Vlahina mountain. On January 29, 1944, thirteen Bulgarian Partizans died in a battle near the village.
Lisiya Ridge on Graham Land, Antarctica is named after the village.

References

Villages in Blagoevgrad Province